North Plains may refer to:

 North Plains Township, Michigan
 North Plains, Oregon